The Dying Hours is a 2013 book by British author, Mark Billingham. It is one of a series featuring his signature character, Tom Thorne.

Synopsis
Tom Thorne has returned to uniform duties, having been removed from the Murder Squad. Thorne is suspicious of a spate of deaths of elderly people that are officially ruled suicides, and begins investigating alone. Soon, he finds himself on the trail of a serial killer who preys on the elderly.

Reception
In the Tampa Bay Times, the author was described as 'fiendishly clever about subverting our expectations' with the 'breathtaking and surprising climax'.
A lengthy feature was published in The Independent while Billingham was also interviewed by The Daily Telegraph and BBC Radio 4.

References

2013 British novels
Novels set in London
Novels about serial killers
British detective novels
Sphere Books books